English singer-songwriter Dido has recorded songs for her four studio albums and collaborated with other artists for duets and featured songs on their respective albums. After collaborating with her brother, Rollo Armstrong, on his band's successful debut album Reverence (1996), she opted to pursue a solo career, signing a record deal with Arista Records the following year. Her first studio album, No Angel, was released in 1999 in the United States. Initially a modest commercial hit, its sales were boosted after its lead single, "Here with Me", became the theme song of the television series Roswell and its third single, "Thank You", was featured on the soundtrack to Sliding Doors and was sampled by American rapper Eminem in his hit song "Stan". No Angel received critical acclaim, and has sold over 12 million copies, becoming certified platinum twelve times. It topped music charts in thirteen countries and became the best-selling debut by any female British artist.

In 2003, Arista Records released Dido's second album, Life for Rent. It experienced commercial success, and became the fastest-selling album by a female solo artist in UK history. Its lead single, "White Flag", was nominated for the Grammy Award for Best Female Pop Vocal Performance and won the BRIT Award for Best British Single and the Ivor Novello Award for International Hit of the Year.

During a five-year hiatus, Dido moved from London to Los Angeles to write and record her third album, Safe Trip Home, which was released in 2008. It was the first to feature co-producer Jon Brion. Its first official single was "Don't Believe in Love". In 2010, Dido collaborated with composer A. R. Rahman and recorded "If I Rise" for the film 127 Hours, eventually earning an Academy Award nomination for Best Original Song. Dido initially planned to follow up with Safe Trip Home relatively quickly with her fourth studio album, Girl Who Got Away, but a pregnancy delayed its release to 2013.

List of songs

References

General
 

Specific

Dido